Anita Ifeoma Isede, known as Omalicha (also spelt as "Omalisha") is from Agbor in Delta state, Nigeria. She is a presenter on Rhythm 93.7 where she co-hosts the "morning drive", the "late morning show (faji Friday)", "Hola at the seaside (a request show)" and the "seaside".

Early life and education  
Omalisha is the oldest of three siblings and the only girl of her family. She is from Agbor, Delta State of Nigeria. Omalisha is a graduate of French from the University of Lagos. She first recorded her voice on Cobhams Asuquo laptop, while in school together, as a bit of an audio voice over which later received the attention of Rhythm FM where she started her career. She plans on having a Vlog and starting a cooking business.

Career 
She interviewed Yemi Osinbajo, the Vice President of Nigeria, during their election in 2015.

Personal life 
On 21 December 2015 Rhythm FM radio, Omalicha got engaged to her longtime boyfriend Alex Hughes also known as DJ X-EL. In August 2016, the On-Air-Personality took to her Instagram page to announce her pregnancy.

References

Living people
University of Lagos alumni
Year of birth missing (living people)
People from Delta State